Adam Freytag (1608 in Toruń, Crown of Poland – 1650 in Kėdainiai, Grand Duchy of Lithuania) was a Polish engineer.

1608 births
1650 deaths
People from Kėdainiai
People from Toruń
Polish engineers